Henry Holland "Jumbo" Vassall (23 March 1887 – 8 October 1949) was an English rugby union player, best known as a centre for Oxford University in the first decade of the twentieth century. In 1908 Vassall played a single international rugby game for England and that same year for the Anglo-Welsh team on their tour of Australia and New Zealand.

Notes

1887 births
1949 deaths
English rugby union players
Rugby union centres
Barbarian F.C. players
Oxford University RFC players
England international rugby union players
British & Irish Lions rugby union players from England
People educated at Bedford School
Rugby union players from Devon